Dr. Upinderjit Kaur is an Indian politician and belongs to the ruling Shiromani Akali Dal.

Early life
Her father S.Atma Singh was a minister Punjab and Akali Dal leader. Her mother's name is Bibi Tej Kaur. She did M.A. in economics from Delhi University and M.A. in Punjabi from Panjab University, Chandigarh. She got Ph.D in Economics from Punjabi University, Patiala.

Academic career
She has taught Economics at Punjabi University and was Professor of Economics. She was also served as the Principal of Guru Nanak Khalsa College, Sultanpur Lodhi, and Dist. Kapurthala. She has written two books 'Development of Theory of Demand' and 'Sikh Religion and Economic Development'. Her second book is about the role of non-economic factors, especially religion in economic development. She was awarded Dr. Ganda Singh Memorial Award for original research paper 'The Place and Status of Women in Sikh Society'.

Political career
She was elected to the Punjab Legislative Assembly in 1997 on an Akali Dal ticket from Sultanpur for first time. She was made a cabinet minister in the Prakash Singh Badal government and given portfolio of Technical Education and Industrial Training, Cultural Affairs and Tourism, Housing and Urban Development. She was re-elected from Sultanpur in 2002 and 2007. She was again made cabinet minister in 2007 and was minister of Education, Civil Aviation, Vigilance and Justice. In October 2010, she was made minister of finance after the removal of Manpreet Singh Badal. She is the first woman finance minister in the independent India. She has remained member of various Vidhan Sabha Committees, such as Public Accounts Committee, Estimates Committee, Public Undertakings Committee, House Committee. In 2012 Punjab elections she was the oldest candidate among woman at the age of 72.

References

Shiromani Akali Dal politicians
State cabinet ministers of Punjab, India
Punjab, India MLAs 2007–2012
Place of birth missing (living people)
Living people
Sikh politics
Education Ministers of Punjab, India
Finance Ministers of Punjab, India
Punjab, India MLAs 1997–2002
Punjab, India MLAs 2002–2007
Delhi University alumni
Panjab University alumni
Punjabi University alumni
20th-century Indian women politicians
20th-century Indian politicians
21st-century Indian women politicians
21st-century Indian politicians
People from Sultanpur district
20th-century Indian educational theorists
21st-century Indian educational theorists
21st-century Indian women scientists
20th-century Indian women scientists
21st-century Indian economists
20th-century Indian economists
Indian women economists
Women state cabinet ministers of India
Women scientists from Punjab, India
Year of birth missing (living people)
Educators from Punjab, India
Women educators from Punjab, India
20th-century women educators
21st-century women educators
Women members of the Punjab Legislative Assembly